A Latinism (from ) is a word, idiom, or structure in a language other than Latin that is derived from, or suggestive of, the Latin language. The Term Latinism refers to those loan words that are borrowed into another language directly from Latin (especially frequent among inkhorn terms); English has many of these, as well. There are many Latinisms in English, and other (especially European) languages.

Lexical Latinism

On the basic level of particular words and lexemes, creation and adoption of Latinisms has a long history, dating back to the ancient times. Early lexical Latinisms are attested in various languages that came into contact with Latin language during the expansion of ancient Roman culture. The same process continued during the Middle Ages, and acquired new forms in modern times under the influence of scientific terminology, largely based on the Scientific Latin. As a particular subgroup of lexical Latinisms, various onomastic Latinisms are formed through Latinisation of proper names, including personal names and toponyms.

Syntactical Latinism

Renewed interest in Classical Latin literature during the Renaissance period resulted in the emergence of various forms of syntactical Latinisms, manifested by a tendency of renaissance and later authors to shape the syntax of their sentences according to rhetorical style used by Classical Latin authors, like Cicero and Caesar.

Idiomatic Latinism

Idiomatic Latinisms are phrases or idioms that are adopted from Latin language, or modeled according to Latin phraseology.

See also

 Latin influence in English
 List of Latin expressions
 List of Latin abbreviations
 List of Latin legal terms
 New Latin
 Vulgar Latin

References

Latin language
Word coinage

de:Fremdwort#Lateinische Lehn- und Fremdwörter